The 2019 Junior World Artistic Gymnastics Championships were the inaugural Artistic Gymnastics Junior World Championships. They were held in Győr, Hungary from 27 June to 30 June 2019.

Competition schedule

Qualifiers

Countries that qualified athletes to the 2018 Youth Olympic Games were eligible to send a full team, other countries had to apply for a wild card. The following countries qualified a team:

MAG

WAG

Medals summary

Medalists
Names with an asterisk (*) denote the team alternate.

Medal standings

Overall

Boys

Girls

Men's results

Team

Oldest and youngest competitors

Individual all-around

Oldest and youngest competitors

Floor exercise

Oldest and youngest competitors

Pommel horse

Oldest and youngest competitors

Still rings

Oldest and youngest competitors

Vault

Oldest and youngest competitors

Parallel bars

Oldest and youngest competitors

Horizontal bar

Oldest and youngest competitors

Women's results

Team

Oldest and youngest competitors

Individual all-around

Oldest and youngest competitors

Vault

Oldest and youngest competitors

Uneven bars

Oldest and youngest competitors

Balance beam

Oldest and youngest competitors

Floor exercise

Oldest and youngest competitors

Qualification

Men's results

Floor exercise

Pommel horse

Still rings

Vault

Parallel bars

Horizontal bar

Women's results

Vault

Uneven bars

Balance beam

Floor exercise

References

External links 

 Official website 

World Artistic Gymnastics Championships
Junior World Gymnastics Championships
World Championships Junior
Artistic Gymnastics Junior World Championships
Gymnastics Championships
Sport in Győr
Gymnastics competitions in Hungary
World Junior Artistic Gymnastics Championships